The 1982–83 DDR-Oberliga was the 34th season of the DDR-Oberliga, the first tier of league football in East Germany.

The league was contested by fourteen teams. BFC Dynamo won the championship, the club's fifth of ten consecutive East German championships from 1978 to 1988.

Joachim Streich of 1. FC Magdeburg was the league's top scorer with 19 goals, with Streich also taking out the seasons East German Footballer of the year award.

On the strength of the 1982–83 title BFC Dynamo qualified for the 1983–84 European Cup where the club was knocked out by A.S. Roma in the quarter finals. Sixth-placed club 1. FC Magdeburg qualified for the 1983–84 European Cup Winners' Cup as the seasons FDGB-Pokal winners and lost to FC Barcelona in the first round. Second-placed FC Vorwärts Frankfurt qualified for the 1983–84 UEFA Cup where it was knocked out by Nottingham Forest in the first round while third-placed FC Carl Zeiss Jena lost to Sparta Rotterdam in the second round and fourth-placed 1. FC Lokomotive Leipzig was eliminated by Sturm Graz in the third round.

Table									
The 1982–83 season saw two newly promoted clubs, 1. FC Union Berlin and BSG Chemie Böhlen.

Results

References

Sources

External links
 Das Deutsche Fussball Archiv  Historic German league tables

Ober
1982-83
1